The Indo-Malaysian drywood termite, (Cryptotermes cynocephalus), is a species of dry wood termite of the genus Cryptotermes. It is found in Philippines, Australia, Papua New Guinea, Hawaii, and introduced to Sri Lanka. It is the smallest termite species in Australia, with 2.5 – 3.7mm in soldiers.

Description
Imago - General body color is pale brown. Abdomen is darker than head and pronotum. Jointed appendages are creamy white.
Soldier - On soldier's head, there is a strongly V-shaped frontal flange. Head is complete black with orange posterior. Head strongly concave in middle. Mandibles short and stout. Teeth are weak. Eyes very small and rudiment-like.

Impact
The feeding preference of this species of drywood termites was found to be from most to least preferred: Falcataria moluccana, Acacia mangium, Gmelina arborea, Swietenia macrophylla, and Eucalyptus deglupta in a series of no-choice and choice feeding trials in the Philippines. These wood species are used widely for light construction, in plywood and veneer based products where termite infestations can cause severe damage.

Control
Oleic Acid isolated from Cerbera manghas are known to have effective controlling activities against termites.

References

External links
Indo-Malaysian drywood termite Cryptotermes cynocephalus Light Image
First Record of Cryptotermes cynocephalus Light (Isoptera: Kalotermitidae) and Natural Woodland Infestations of C. brevis (Walker) on Oahu, Hawaiian Islands
Semiochemicals of Cryptotermes cynocephalus, the Indo-Malaysian termite
Responses to Wood and Wood Extractives of Neobalanocarpus heimii and Shorea ovalis by the drywood termite, Cryptotermes cynocephalus (Isoptera : Kalotermitidae)
Feeding preference behaviour of Cryptotermes cynocephalus Light and Coptotermes curvignathus Holmgren on twenty eight tropical timbers

Termites
Insects described in 1921
Arthropods of the Philippines